Call of Duty Championship 2015 was a Call of Duty: Advanced Warfare on Xbox One tournament that occurred on March 27–29, 2015.

It was won by Denial eSports with a team consisting of Chris "Replays" Crowder, Dillon "Attach" Price, James "Clayster" Eubanks, and Jordan "JKap" Kaplan. Clayster was named most valuable player of the event.

The tournament was livestreamed online on MLG.tv.

Format
Group Play
8 groups of 4 teams
Teams played every other team once in a best of 5
Top 2 teams in each group advanced to the playoffs
In case of tie, head-to-head results will determine who advances
If 3 teams were tied and the head-to-head is inconclusive, a single sudden death game will determine who advances

Playoffs
The games were best of 5.
Winners continue on in the Upper Bracket.
Losers dropped down to Lower Bracket
A loss in the losers bracket results in elimination

Note: Matches were to be played to determine 3rd-8th placements

Game Types and Maps
Hardpoint: Bio Lab, Detroit, Solar, Retreat
Search and Destroy: Bio Lab, Detroit, Drift, Recovery, Riot, Solar, Terrace
Uplink: Bio Lab, Comeback, Detroit
Capture the Flag: Ascend, Bio Lab, Detroit, Retreat

Qualified teams

32 teams will qualify for the tournament through their individual regions offline qualifiers with varying amounts of qualifying spots available.

^ Teams are listed by their final positions of their regions qualifiers.

^ Flags represent the nationality of the majority of players on a team's active roster, not the country in which the organization is based.

Groups

Final standings

References

External links
 Official webpage

2015 in Los Angeles
2015 in sports in California
Call of Duty Championship, 2015
Call of Duty Championship